Halina Karnatsevich, née Baruk (born 2 November 1969) is a Belarusian long-distance runner.

She finished twelfth in the marathon at the 2005 World Championships in a personal best time of 2:27:14 hours.

In 2006 Karnatsevich was found guilty of stanozolol doping. The sample was delivered on 17 June 2006 in an in-competition test in Duluth, Minnesota, United States. She received an IAAF suspension from July 2006 to July 2008.

Achievements

References

External links
marathoninfo

1969 births
Living people
Belarusian female long-distance runners
Doping cases in athletics
Belarusian sportspeople in doping cases
Belarusian female marathon runners